Mallobathra cataclysma is a moth of the family Psychidae. This species is endemic to New Zealand.

References 

Moths described in 1934
Moths of New Zealand
Psychidae
Endemic fauna of New Zealand
Taxa named by Charles Edwin Clarke
Endemic moths of New Zealand